The defending champions were Karol Beck and Lukáš Dlouhý decided not to participate.Jamie Delgado and Jordan Kerr won the title, defeating James Cluskey and Adrián Menéndez-Maceiras 6–3, 6–2 in the final.

Seeds

Draw

Draw

References
 Main Draw

American Express - TED Open - Doubles
2012 Doubles
2013 in Turkish tennis